Eildon is a Renaissance Revival style mansion in Grey Street, St Kilda, Melbourne, the largest house in the suburb, and is listed on the Victorian Heritage Register.

It began as the Regency style Barham House, built in c1850 for Edward Bernard Green (1809-1861), to the designs of architect John Gill, on very large grounds with bay views.

The house was altered and enlarged in 1872 to the design of Reed & Barnes for pastoralist John Currie, and renamed Eildon in 1877. By 1917 it was a guesthouse, and the site greatly reduced in 1921, then from 1951 it was a boarding house run by Mr. Ferit Ymer and his wife Qerime, operating into the 2000s. In 2006 it became the home of the Alliance Francaise, then sold again in early 2022 to become a home once more.

History
Edward Green purchased the site at the first land sale in 1847, when St Kilda was a seaside village far from town, and built Barham House in c1850. 

Wealthy pastoralist John Lang Currie (1818–1898) purchased the property in 1869 and greatly enlarged it in 1872, to the designs of Joseph Reed, of the leading Melbourne architectural firm of Reed & Barnes (who also later designed the nearby Church of the Sacred Heart and many other prominent Melbourne buildings, such as the Royal Exhibition Building). Currie was one of Victoria's largest landowners, and created the house for his retirement, in what was by then a seaside suburb popular with the wealthy.

John Currie liked elaborate gardens on his properties, to entertain; nearly all his properties had similar formats, small front yards and grand backyards. Eildon Mansion was no exception. At Eildon, he liked to take visitors for walks to the beach and then a lazy stroll back through his wonderful garden back to Eildon, where they could admire the bayside face of the house. John Currie's daughter Henrietta had her marriage celebrations at the ballroom at Eildon Mansion. John Currie also leased the Osborne house in Geelong, and also had Lara House and Gala house which are both in Camperdown in Victoria. The Lara property was a very important property for John Currie, as this is where his success a pastoralist was established.

John Currie died on March 11, 1898, and his tomb can be found at the St Kilda Cemetery. He left an estate of 479,000 pounds to his wife Louise and his 5 sons and 3 daughters. Louise died in 1901, but the property stayed in the family until at least 1917, when the first ads for it was as a guesthouse appeared. The southern end was sold off in 1921 and subdivided, with an access road, now the southern part of Eildon Road.

From 1951 it was owned by Mr. Ferit Ymer and his wife Qerime. In 1953 they sold off the last portion of the grounds, creating Newton Court, with five blocks, two quite close to the rear of the house. They raised their 6 children there, while they operated the home as boarding house, accommodating mainly single men, including newly arrived migrants. In the later years the rents they could charge declined, as did maintenance on the building. Two of the owner's sons, Enver and Danny, undertook extensive restorations in 2004, converting the house into backpackers accommodation, but sold it in 2006. The Ymer family held Eildon Mansion for over 56 years.

The house was bought for a reported $4 million by the Alliance Française for their new Melbourne headquarters, moving from nearby Robe Street, spending well over 1.5 million dollars on renovations. They removed the partitions from the 1930s that subdivided the larger rooms, and set up the mansion for their workshops, French classes, library and a theatre room where the main kitchen used to be. They restored the ballroom, which was used for functions and exhibitions.

In early 2022, the Alliance Francais sold the property for a reported $9 million to couple Gary Singer and Geoffrey Smith, who run a successful art and antiques auction house.

Eildon is a microcosm of the fortunes of St. Kilda over the years. Once a seaside prestige suburb, it became a playground for the masses with many guesthouses and blocks of flats in the early 20th century, but by the 1960s it was unloved, cheap and faded, then revived in the 1990s to become both popular, and a home for the wealthy again.

Description 

The layout of the house clearly shows its history with the central part retaining the walls of Barham, with long wings added either side, a loggia joining them to the rear, and new facades. The architecture is Renaissance Revival, featuring pilasters flanking the windows, some with arches, those on the added wings in the form of Palladian windows with pediments, a balustraded cornice, and the most striking feature on the entrance side being the deep, wide quoins in each corner of each projecting bay. The rear (garden) facade features matching detailing, bay windows on the added wings, and a double level loggia with full height piers and pilasters and arcading.   

The 1847 site was somewhat wider and continued down to Church Square (almost to  Acland Street). Photos of the property as a guesthouse show the rear gardens were mostly lawn, most likely to allow views of the bay. 

Though the 'rear' facade is equally as grand as the Grey Street side, the latter was  always the front entrance.  The original stables can be seen beside the house on the right on the Grey Street side. Like most big Victorian properties, the front entrance was a looped drive, with two gates to Grey Street. In the 1940s a strip of the site to the south was bought by the next door property, reducing the entrance gates to one. 

Despite the various uses, much of the grand interior of the building survived, including marble and timber mantelpieces, ceiling roses, the sweeping stairs, and large basement quarters for servants and a cellar.

External links

Whiting and Co real estate agent's announcement of the sale in 2022, featuring photos of the building
Alliance francaise shows photos of the interiors.
Eildon Mansion Guesthouse as backpackers.

References 

Houses in Melbourne
Neoclassical architecture in Australia
Residential buildings completed in 1877
1877 establishments in Australia
St Kilda, Victoria
Buildings and structures in the City of Port Phillip
Heritage-listed buildings in Melbourne